Angiopoietin-related protein 2 also known as angiopoietin-like protein 2 is a protein that in humans is encoded by the ANGPTL2 gene.

Function 
Angiopoietin-like protein 2 maintains tissue homeostasis by promoting adaptive inflammation and subsequent tissue reconstruction, whereas an excess of ANGPTL2 activation induced by prolonged stress promotes the breakdown of tissue homeostasis due to chronic inflammation, promoting the development of metabolic diseases. ANGPTL2 has a role also in angiogenesis, in tissue repair, in obesity, in atherosclerotic diseases and finally in carcinogenesis.

Angiopoietins are members of the vascular endothelial growth factor family and the only known growth factors largely specific for the vascular endothelium. Angiopoietin-1, angiopoietin-2, and angiopoietin-4 participate in the formation of blood vessels. ANGPTL2 protein is a secreted glycoprotein with homology to the angiopoietins and may exert a function on endothelial cells through autocrine or paracrine action.

References

External links

Further reading